Cord Mysegaes (born 22 March 1968) is a German equestrian and Olympic medalist. He was born in Niedersachsen. He won a bronze medal in team eventing at the 1992 Summer Olympics in Barcelona.

References

1968 births
Living people
German male equestrians
Olympic equestrians of Germany
Olympic bronze medalists for Germany
Equestrians at the 1992 Summer Olympics
Sportspeople from Lower Saxony
Olympic medalists in equestrian
Medalists at the 1992 Summer Olympics